Mirror for a Hero is a 1987 Soviet two-part science fiction drama film directed by Vladimir Khotinenko based on the short story of the same name by Stanislav Rybas.

Plot
Metropolitan psychologist-linguist Sergei Pshenichny (Sergey Koltakov), soon after quarreling with his father (Felix Stepun) on ideological grounds, meets with former mining engineer Andrei Nemchinov (Ivan Bortnik), who recently returned from prison, at a concert by the rock band Nautilus Pompilius.

After the concert, Sergei and Andrei, passing through the city park, see that a film shooting is taking place, about the post-war time. To get a better look at what is happening on the set, they decide to climb over the park fence, but hit some cable lying on the ground and get transferred into the past — in the late 1940s.

But this test for Sergei and his random acquaintance does not end. Every time the night passes and morning begins, the day is always May 8, 1949. They relive the same day over and over again, trying to break the loop. Meanwhile, Sergei gets acquainted with the younger version of his parents (his mother currently being pregnant with him), and Andrei with his 10-year-old self. Eventually the loop breaks and the characters return to the present.

Cast
Sergey Koltakov as Sergei Pshenichny
Ivan Bortnik as Andrei Nemchinov
Felix Stepun as Kirill Pshenichny, the father of Sergei
 as young Kirill Pshenichny
 as young Lida, the mother of Sergei
Elena Golyanova as Roza
 as Sashka the tanker (voiced by Avangard Leontiev)
Viktor Smirnov as director of the mine Tyukin 
 as miner Fyodor Petrenko
 as Stakhanovite miner Pukharev
 as policeman Ryabenko
Elena Kozlitina as Sergei's wife

Production
Filming took place in the city of Donetsk, and in Donetsk (villages of Abakumov, Karl Marx, Makeyevka, Kurahivka) and Voroshilovgrad (village of Bokovo-Platovo) oblasts.

Music
 At the beginning of the movie, there is the Russian version of Smith's Sérénade from La jolie fille de Perth, an opera by Georges Bizet (singing Gennady Pishchayev).

Awards and nominations

References

External links

1980s science fiction drama films
Films about the Soviet Union in the Stalin era
Films based on science fiction short stories
Films directed by Vladimir Khotinenko
Films released in separate parts
Films set in 1949
Films set in the 1980s
Films shot in Ukraine
Films about mining
Soviet science fiction drama films
Time loop films
1987 drama films
1987 films